Big body may refer to:

Kinnikuman Big Body
Toyota Corolla (E100), local nickname in the Philippines
Big Body (P-Model album)
Big Body Entertainment Espionage (album)